John Pegram (November 16, 1773April 8, 1831) was a Virginia planter, soldier and politician who served in the  United States House of Representatives, both houses of the Virginia General Assembly and a major general during the War of 1812.

Early and family life
John Pegram was the son of Edward Pegram and Ann Lyle. Born at the "Bonneville" plantation in Dinwiddie County in the Colony of Virginia, Pegram received a private education suitable to his class.

He married Martha Ward Gregory, and they had several children. Decades after his death, three of their grandsons became Confederate generals, as noted below.

Career

As a young adult, Pegram held various local offices and won his first election in 1797, becoming one of Dinwiddie County's (part-time) representatives in the Virginia House of Delegates. He also won re-election and served from 1797 to 1801, then won election to the Virginia Senate, and served one term from 1804 until 1808, before again winning election during the War of 1812, and serving from 1813–15.
In 1802, Col. Pegram replaced revolutionary war veteran John Crawford as commander of Virginia's 39th Militia regiment, composed of white male volunteers from Petersburg who were required to attend yearly (and sometimes monthly or even more often); beginbing in 1808 his counterpart in the 83rd Regiment (composed of white men from Dinwiddie County) was Lt.Col. Braddock Goodwyn.  Pegram became the major general of the Virginia militia in the War of 1812 and held field command of all state forces. Following the war, he accepted appointment as United States marshal for the eastern district of Virginia, April 23, 1821.
Pegram won a special election as a Democratic-Republican to the Fifteenth Congress to fill the vacancy caused by the death of United States Representative Peterson Goodwyn. He served from April 21, 1818 – March 3, 1819, but did not seek reelection.

Death and legacy

He died at his home in Dinwiddie County and was buried on the family plantation.<ref>The official Congressional biography incorrectly states that Pegram was killed in a boat fire on the Ohio River and his body never recovered. That victim, however, was his son, James West Pegram (see Brown). J. W. Pegram's memorial stone in Hollywood Cemetery also refers to the boat fire as the cause of his death.</r
Three of his grandsons became prominent officers in the Confederate Army of Northern Virginia during the American Civil War—John Pegram, William Ransom Johnson Pegram and Richard Gregory Pegram, Jr.

References

 Brown, John Howard, The Twentieth Century Biographical Dictionary of Notable Americans. Boston: The Biographical Society, 1904.

Notes

1773 births
1831 deaths
American militia generals
United States Marshals
Democratic-Republican Party members of the United States House of Representatives from Virginia
Members of the Virginia House of Delegates
People from Dinwiddie County, Virginia
American militiamen in the War of 1812
Virginia state senators
Burials in Virginia